Manta or mantas may refer to:

 Manta ray, large fish belonging to the genus Manta

Arts and entertainment

App & Website
 Manta (platform), a Korean digital comics provider

Fictional entities
 Manta (comics), a character in American Marvel Comics publications
 Manta (Uridium), a spaceship in the British computer game Uridium
 Manta Oyamada, a character in the Japanese manga series Shaman King
 Manta and Moray, amphibious superheroes from the 1970s TV series Tarzan and the Super 7

Film
 Manta, Manta, a 1991 German-language action comedy film

Music
 Death (metal band), an American band known as Mantas (1983–1984)
 Jeffrey Dunn (born 1961), known as Mantas, and his band Mantas, formed in 1986

People
 Manta (surname) (includes a list of people with that name)
 Mantas, a given name and a surname (includes a list of people with that name)
 Manta people, nomadic ethnic group in Bangladesh

Places
 Manta, Benin a town and arrondissement in Atakora department, Benin
 Manta, Cundinamarca, a municipality and town Almeidas province, Colombia
 Manta, Ecuador, a city in Manabí Province, Ecuador
Manta Canton
 Eloy Alfaro International Airport, formerly Forward Operating Base Manta
 Manta Fútbol Club
 Manta, Piedmont, a municipality in Cuneo, Italy
 Manta, Cahul, a commune in Cahul district, Moldova
Mantaş, Tarsus, a village in Mersin Province, Turkey

Transportation
Manta Cars, American manufacturer of the Manta Mirage and Manta Montage
 Aeros del Sur Manta, an Argentine ultralight trike aircraft 
 Opel Manta, a German car
 TR-3A Black Manta, an American surveillance aircraft
 , two U.S. Navy ships/submarines
 Lockheed Martin X-44 MANTA, an American concept aircraft
 Manta Foxbat, an American ultralight aircraft by Manta Products Inc
 Northrop N-381 Manta, an American naval strike aircraft concept

Other uses

 Manta (dress), a traditional dress of indigenous peoples of the Americas
 Manta (SeaWorld San Diego), a roller coaster 
 Manta (SeaWorld Orlando), a roller coaster 
 M.A.N.T.A., a G.I. Joe toy
 Manta Force, a British toy
 Operation Manta, the French military intervention in Chad 1983–1984
 Manti (food), or manta, a type of dumpling in central Asian and Turkic cuisines
 Google Nexus 10, an Android tablet computer with the codename manta.

See also

 
 
 Mant (disambiguation)
 Mantra (disambiguation)
 Manta Ray (disambiguation)
 Black Manta, a character in American DC Comics publications